The Lake Katam is one of the larger lakes in Ounianga Kebir, a lake system in the Borkou-Ennedi-Tibesti Region in the north-east basin of Chad. These lakes are notable for their running in the north–south headlands, by the Trade wind are formed. They are the remnant of a much larger lake, that filled the basin during the so-called green Sahara-time, which lasted from about BC 10000–1500.

See also 
 Lake Yoa
 Lakes of Ounianga

Katam